Yaounde Nsimalen International Airport , also known as Nsimalen airport, is the second busiest and largest public airport in Cameroon. The airport is located 27 km (16 miles) south of the capital Yaounde, near Nsimalen in Cameroon's Centre Province.

History
Starting operations in 1991, Nsimalen was built to supersede the old international airport in Yaounde that was getting absorbed by the rapid growth of the city, it was also too close to the oil deposits of SCDP ("Société Camerounaise de Dépôts Pétroliers" or Cameroon Oil Storage Company). This former international airport of Yaounde now serves as an airbase for the air force of Cameroon.

In 2004, the Nsimalen airport served 190,487 passengers. Yaounde Nsimalen International Airport has 14 direct flights to 11 countries. It is also the focus city for the most popular airline in Cameroon, Camair-Co, successor to the defunct Cameroon Airlines. The airport's growth of international traffic is 4% per year. The government has set a goal of servicing 1.5 million passengers and 50,000 tons of cargo per year.

Facilities
Yaounde Nsimalen International Airport covers 3,065 acres (1240 ha) at an elevation of 694 m (2 276 ft), and includes one passenger terminal, one cargo terminal and 6 aircraft stands. Nsimalen airport currently has one runway: heading 01/19, 3,400 m (11 154 ft) in length, with a width of 45 m (147 ft), which could accommodate a Boeing 747.

Nsimalen International Airport is equipped with modern facilities and can be accessed through four gates. It has six parking facilities, two of which are for long term use. Inside the terminal there are 10 check-in desks, currency exchange office, post office, restaurants, tourist information centre, business centre, banks and car rental and taxi services. Cargo facilities are equipped with a 1,839 m2 (19 794 sq ft) warehouse, twelve 747 Freighter docks, a transit zone, animal quarantine, health office, X-ray/handling/mechanical equipment and refrigerated storage.

Airlines and destinations

Notes
: Brussels Airlines' flight to Brussels from Yaounde stops in Douala, but the airline does not have eight freedom rights on the Yaounde and Douala sector.

Accidents and incidents
The following accidents and incidents occurred either at the airport, or involved aircraft from the airport.

On 30 August 1984, Cameroon Airlines Flight 786, a Boeing 737-200 registered as (TJ-CBD), experienced an engine malfunction when taxiing at Douala International Airport prior to departure for Yaounde. A fire from the damaged fuel tank engulfed the aircraft causing it to burn out. Two passengers were trapped by the flames and died. The remaining 107 passengers and seven crew members were able to evacuate the plane safely.
On 28 June 1989, a Cameroon Airlines Hawker Siddeley HS 748 plane from Bafoussam registered as (TJ-CCF) overshot the runway by 43 m upon landing in stormy weather at Yaounde International Airport following a scheduled flight from Douala and collided with an embankment, killing the two pilots and one of the 45 passengers on board.

References

External links
 
 

Airports in Cameroon
Buildings and structures in Yaoundé